Horninglow and Eton is a civil parish in the East Staffordshire district, in the county of Staffordshire, England. It covers an area located in the west of Burton upon Trent, including Horninglow. In 2021 the parish had a population of 15,700. The parish was created on 1 April 2003.

See also
Listed buildings in Horninglow and Eton

References 

Civil parishes in Staffordshire
Burton upon Trent